The 2009 San Diego State Aztecs football team represented San Diego State University in the 2009 NCAA Division I FBS football season. The Aztecs, led by first-year head coach Brady Hoke, played their home games at the Qualcomm Stadium. They finished with a record of 4–8 (2–6 MWC).

Schedule

References

San Diego State
San Diego State Aztecs football seasons
San Diego State Aztecs football